Nascioides is a genus of beetles in the family Buprestidae, containing the following species:

 Nascioides bicolor Williams, 1987
 Nascioides caledonica Williams & Bellamy, 2002
 Nascioides carissima (Waterhouse, 1882)
 Nascioides costata (Carter, 1912)
 Nascioides elderi Williams, 1987
 Nascioides elessarella Williams, 1987
 Nascioides enysi (Sharp, 1877)
 Nascioides falsomultesima Williams, 1987
 Nascioides macalpinei Williams, 1987
 Nascioides multesima (Olliff, 1886)
 Nascioides munda (Olliff, 1886)
 Nascioides nulgarra Williams, 1987
 Nascioides olliffi Williams & Watkins, 1985
 Nascioides parryi (Hope, 1843)
 Nascioides pulcher (van de Poll, 1886)
 Nascioides quadrinotata (van de Poll, 1886)
 Nascioides storeyi Williams, 1987
 Nascioides subcostata Williams & Bellamy, 2002
 Nascioides tillyardi (Carter, 1912)
 Nascioides viridis (Macleay, 1872)
 Nascioides walfordorum Williams & Bellamy, 2002

References

Buprestidae genera